Juan Tuñas Bajeneta or Romperredes (17 July 1917 – 4 April 2011) was a Cuban footballer.

Club career
He played for the Cuban clubs Juventud Asturiana and Centro Gallego. After helping lead Cuba to the quarterfinals in their only World Cup appearance, he moved to Mexico and played for Real Club España, winning two Liga Mayor (Mexico First Division) championships there, in 1942 and 1945.

International career
Tuñas was a member of the Cuba national football team that played at the 1938 FIFA World Cup in France, winning the game to Romania (according to the official FIFA match report ).

Personal life
His nickname Romperredes means "net-breaker", after his powerful shots on goal with him once shooting a hole in a goalnet. In 2005, he received the Gloria del Deporte Cubano Award in Havana. After his retirement he resided in Mexico City and was the last surviving member of Cuba's squad from the 1938 World Cup. He died in April 2011.

References

External links

 
 
 biographical sketch at CONCACAF
 FIFA article

1917 births
2011 deaths
Sportspeople from Havana
Association football forwards
Cuban footballers
Cuba international footballers
1938 FIFA World Cup players
Real Club España footballers
Liga MX players
Cuban expatriate footballers
Expatriate footballers in Mexico
Cuban expatriate sportspeople in Mexico
Cuban emigrants to Mexico